Reino Ragnar Lehto (2 May 1898 – 13 July 1966; surname until 1901 Lagerlund) served as caretaker Prime Minister of Finland from 1963 to 1964, then served as governor of Uusimaa province until his death on 13 July 1966. He was a lawyer by profession.

Cabinets
 Lehto Cabinet

References

1898 births
1966 deaths
People from Turku
People from Turku and Pori Province (Grand Duchy of Finland)
Prime Ministers of Finland
Finnish politicians